is a junction railway station in the city of Natori, Miyagi, Japan, operated by East Japan Railway Company (JR East). The station also has a freight terminal operated by the Japan Freight Railway Company.

Lines

Station layout
The station has one side platform and one island platform, serving three tracks in total, connected to the station building by a footbridge. The station has a Midori no Madoguchi staffed ticket office.

Platforms

History
It adopted its present name on May 25, 1963. The station was absorbed into the JR East network upon the privatization of the Japanese National Railways (JNR) on April 1, 1987.

Passenger statistics
In fiscal 2018, the station was used by an average of 12,927 passengers daily (boarding passengers only).

Surrounding area

Natori City Hall
Natori Post Office
 Sapporo Beer Sendai Factory
 Sendai Beer Garden

See also
 List of Railway Stations in Japan

References

External links

  

Railway stations in Miyagi Prefecture
Tōhoku Main Line
Jōban Line
Sendai Airport Line
Railway stations in Japan opened in 1888
Stations of Japan Freight Railway Company
Stations of East Japan Railway Company
Natori, Miyagi